The Sikorsky Cypher and Cypher II are types of unmanned aerial vehicles developed by Sikorsky Aircraft. They are vertical takeoff and landing aircraft which use two opposing rotors enclosed in a circular shroud for propulsion.

Design and development

Cypher
In the late 1980s, Sikorsky Aircraft flew a small UAV named "Cypher", with coaxial rotors inside a torus-shaped airframe. The torus shroud improved handling safety and helped increase lift. The first proof-of-concept Cypher was 1.75 meters (5.75 feet) in diameter and 55 centimeters (1.8 feet) tall, weighed 20 kilograms (43 pounds), and was first flown in the summer of 1988. This design was powered by a four-stroke, 2.85 kW (3.8 hp) engine and was mounted on a truck for forward-flight tests.

It led to a true flight prototype Cypher that weighed 110 kilograms (240 pounds), had a diameter of 1.9 meters (6.2 feet) and was powered by a compact, 40 kW (53 hp) Wankel engine. After an initial free flight in 1993, the Cypher prototype was used in flight tests and demonstrations through most of the 1990s, ultimately leading to a next-generation design, the Cypher II, which was a competitor in the United States Navy VT-UAV competition.

The single prototype first flew in April 1992 and flew untethered in 1993. Since then, over 550 demonstration flights have been made for the US government.

The Cypher can carry a sensor package on struts above its hull, or can transport loads weighing up to 50 lb (23 kg).

Cypher II
Two Cypher II prototypes have been built for the US Marine Corps, which calls it "Dragon Warrior". The Cypher II is similar in size to its predecessor, but has a pusher propeller in addition to its rotor and can be fitted with wings for long-range reconnaissance missions. In its winged configuration, the Cypher II has a range of over 185 kilometers (115 miles) and a top speed of 230 km/h (145 mph). It is unclear if the Cypher will enter production.

Specifications (Cypher)

See also

References

This article contains material that originally came from the web article Unmanned Aerial Vehicles by Greg Goebel, which exists in the Public Domain.

External links

 Cypher

Flying saucers
United States military helicopters
Cypher
1990s United States military reconnaissance aircraft
Unmanned aerial vehicles of the United States
Wankel-engined helicopters
Aircraft first flown in 1988
Unmanned helicopters